Kusruthikaatu is a 1995 Indian Malayalam film, directed by Suresh Vinu and produced by Mani C. Kappan. The film stars Jayaram, Kanaka, Jagathy Sreekumar, Oduvil Unnikrishnan and Chippy in lead roles. The musical score of the film was composed by S. P. Venkatesh while the songs were composed by Tomin J. Thachankery.

Cast

Jayaram as Nandagopal/Nandu 
Kanaka as Indira Nandagopal / Indu
Jagathy Sreekumar as Madhavan Kutty 
Oduvil Unnikrishnan as Dr. K. Gopala Menon 
Chippy as Ganga Thomas 
V. D. Rajappan as Kariyachan 
Indrans as Arogya Swami
Jose Pellissery as College Principal
Ragini as Chinnamma Kariyachan
Sonia 
Thesni Khan 
Sarada Preetha as Reshma 
Philomina
Mini Arun as Thresa
Mani C. Kappan as Ganga's Father
Kundara Johny 
Kanakalatha as Indira’s aunt
Innocent as Indira's Father

References

External links
  
 

1995 films
1990s Malayalam-language films